Amoria dampieria, common name the Dampier's volute, is a species of sea snail, a marine gastropod mollusk in the family Volutidae, the volutes.

Description
The length of the shell varies between 25 mm and 33 mm.

Distribution
This marine species occurs off Northwest Australia.

References

 Bail P. & Limpus A. (2001) The genus Amoria. In: G.T. Poppe & K. Groh (eds) A conchological iconography. Hackenheim: Conchbooks. 50 pp., 93 pls

External links
 

Volutidae
Gastropods described in 1960